Dominik Fótyik (born 16 September 1990) is a Slovak football defender of Hungarian ethnicity who plays for Hungarian side Budafok.

Career
He began his career as centre back or left back, later played as striker and currently plays again as central defender.

MFK Zemplín Michalovce
In July 2011, he joined Slovak club MFK Zemplín Michalovce on a one-year loan from MŠK Žilina. He made his debut for MFK Zemplín Michalovce against FK LAFC Lučenec on 23 July 2011.

Budafok
On 12 June 2021, Fótyik signed with Budafok.

Club statistics

Updated to games played as of 9 December 2017.

External links
MŠK Žilina profile

References

1990 births
Living people
People from Nové Zámky
Sportspeople from the Nitra Region
Association football defenders
Slovak footballers
Slovakia under-21 international footballers
MŠK Žilina players
MFK Zemplín Michalovce players
MFK Tatran Liptovský Mikuláš players
Kazincbarcikai SC footballers
Mezőkövesdi SE footballers
Kecskeméti TE players
Budafoki LC footballers
Slovak Super Liga players
Nemzeti Bajnokság I players
Nemzeti Bajnokság II players
Slovak expatriate footballers
Expatriate footballers in Hungary
Slovak expatriate sportspeople in Hungary